Vítor Hugo Rosário Mendes Correia (born 20 May 1984) is a Portuguese futsal player who plays as a defender for Olho Marinho and the Portugal national team.

Career
Born in Lisbon, Vitor Hugo started his career in amateur club, União e Progresso da Venda Nova, competing there from age 23 to age 25. In 2009, he moved to Associação de Moradores de Santo António dos Cavaleiros, in the Santo António dos Cavaleiros e Frielas parish.

He arrived at first tier to 2011, to represent Leões de Porto Salvo, where he quickly caught the attention of Benfica, which signed him for the following season. At Benfica, Vítor Hugo won a supercup in his first year, but suffered a fractured tibia on a match against Sporting on 16 June 2013. He was sidelined for 21 months, reappearing on 11 March 2015, helping the club win the league and Portuguese cup, before leaving the club on 17 June 2015.

After a brief spell in Italy, at Catanzaro,
he returned to Portugal to play for Olho Marinho in the second tier.

Honours
Benfica
Liga Portuguesa: 2014–15
Taça de Portugal: 2014–15
Supertaça de Portugal: 2012

References

1984 births
Living people
Sportspeople from Lisbon
Portuguese men's futsal players
S.L. Benfica futsal players